Fritillaria sewerzowii is a perennial herbaceous bulbous plant, distributed in alpine areas of central Asia. It is a species in the genus Fritillaria, in the lily family Liliaceae. It is placed in the subgenus Korolkowia.

Description 
Fritillaria sewerzowii reaches a height of 20–50 cm. The egg-shaped bulb is about 5 cm in diameter. The leaves are fleshy and broadly oval at the base of the plant stem and are up to 15 cm in length and evenly distributed up the stem. The plant produces four to ten purple-brown star-shaped individual flowers, 3 cm in length, arising from the leaf axes in the upper stem. F. sewerzowii blooms in early March.

Taxonomy 
First described by Regel in 1868, Baker (1874), who divided Fritillaria into subgenera, placed F. sewerzowii in subgenus Korolkowia as its sole species. Although some authors have treated Korolkowia as a separate genus, molecular phylogenetics has shown that it is embedded within Fritillaria.

Distribution and habitat 
Fritillaria sewerzowii is found in scrub on rocky slopes or lightly wooded areas of Kyrgyzstan and Uzbekistan at 1000–3000 metres altitude.

Cultivation 
Fritillaria sewerzowii is winter hardy (USDA 4-8), but requires well drained soil.

References

Bibliography

External links 

sewerzowii